In cryptography, collision resistance is a property of cryptographic hash functions: a hash function H is collision-resistant if it is hard to find two inputs that hash to the same output; that is, two inputs a and b where a ≠ b but H(a) = H(b). The pigeonhole principle means that any hash function with more inputs than outputs will necessarily have such collisions; the harder they are to find, the more cryptographically secure the hash function is.

The "birthday paradox" places an upper bound on collision resistance: if a hash function produces N bits of output, an attacker who computes only 2N/2 (or ) hash operations on random input is likely to find two matching outputs. If there is an easier method to do this than brute-force attack, it is typically considered a flaw in the hash function.

Cryptographic hash functions are usually designed to be collision resistant. However, many hash functions that were once thought to be collision resistant were later broken. MD5 and SHA-1 in particular both have published techniques more efficient than brute force for finding collisions. However, some hash functions have a proof that finding collisions is at least as difficult as some hard mathematical problem (such as integer factorization or discrete logarithm). Those functions are called provably secure.

Definition
A family of functions {hk : {0, 1}m(k) → {0, 1}l(k)} generated by some algorithm G is a family of collision-resistant hash functions, if |m(k)| > |l(k)| for any k, i.e., hk compresses the input string, and every hk can be computed within polynomial time given k, but for any probabilistic polynomial algorithm A, we have

 Pr [k ← G(1n), (x1, x2) ← A(k, 1n) s.t. x1 ≠ x2 but hk(x1) = hk(x2)] < negl(n),

where negl(·) denotes some negligible function, and n is the security parameter.

Rationale
Collision resistance is desirable for several reasons.
 In some digital signature systems, a party attests to a document by publishing a public key signature on a hash of the document. If it is possible to produce two documents with the same hash, an attacker could get a party to attest to one, and then claim that the party had attested to the other.
 In some distributed content systems, parties compare cryptographic hashes of files in order to make sure they have the same version. An attacker who could produce two files with the same hash could trick users into believing they had the same version of a file when they in fact did not.

See also
 Collision attack
 Preimage attack
 NIST hash function competition
 Provably secure cryptographic hash function
 Error detection and correction

References

Symmetric-key cryptography
Theory of cryptography